The women's K-2 500 metres sprint canoeing competition at the 2006 Asian Games in Doha was held on 13 and 14 December at the West Bay Lagoon.

Schedule
All times are Arabia Standard Time (UTC+03:00)

Results

Heats 
 Qualification: 1 → Final (QF), Rest → Semifinal (QS)

Heat 1

Heat 2

Semifinal 
 Qualification: 1–4 → Final (QF)

Final

References 

Official Website

External links 
Asian Canoe Confederation

Canoeing at the 2006 Asian Games
Asian